Westphalia can refer to any of the following places worldwide:

Places named Westphalia
Germany
Westphalia, a region in Germany, known as Westfalen in German
Duchy of Westphalia
Kingdom of Westphalia
Province of Westphalia
North Rhine-Westphalia
United States
Westphalia, Indiana, an unincorporated community
Westphalia, Iowa, a town
Westphalia, Kansas, a town
Westphalia, Maryland, an unincorporated community
Westphalia, Michigan, a village
Westphalia, Missouri, a town
Westphalia, Texas, an unincorporated community
Westphalia Rural Historic District located around Westphalia, Texas
Westphalia Waltz a waltz which takes the community's name

Other uses
Peace of Westphalia
Westphalian sovereignty
Westphalian
Westfalia, the name given to various camper vans
Westphalia ham, a ham product

See also